The 1994–95 NBA season was the Kings' 46th season in the National Basketball Association, and tenth season in Sacramento. In the 1994 NBA draft, the Kings selected Brian Grant out of Xavier University with the eighth pick. During the off-season, the team signed free agent Frank Brickowski, who missed the entire season with a preseason shoulder injury, and never played for the team during the regular season. With the arrivals of Grant, and second round draft pick Michael Smith, and replacing Lionel Simmons as the team's starting small forward with Walt Williams, the Kings played above .500 for the first half of the season with a 25–20 record at the All-Star break. However, after a 28–20 start, they struggled with a 7-game losing streak afterwards and began to slip under .500. On the final day of the regular season, the Kings faced the Denver Nuggets at McNichols Sports Arena for the eighth and final playoff spot in the Western Conference. The Nuggets would win 102–89 as the Kings went home with a 39–43 record, fifth in the Pacific Division, missing the playoffs for the ninth consecutive season.

Mitch Richmond led the team in scoring with 22.8 points per game, was named to the All-NBA Second Team, and was selected for the 1995 NBA All-Star Game, where he was named the game's MVP. In addition, Williams showed improvement, averaging 16.4 points and 1.6 steals per game, while Grant averaged 13.2 points, 7.5 rebounds and 1.5 blocks per game, and was selected to the NBA All-Rookie First Team, Spud Webb contributed 11.6 points and 6.2 assists per game, Olden Polynice provided the team with 10.8 points and 9.0 rebounds per game, and Smith averaged 6.9 points and 5.9 rebounds per game off the bench. 

Following the season, Webb was traded back to his former team, the Atlanta Hawks, while Brickowski was traded back to his former team, the Seattle SuperSonics, and Randy Brown signed with the Chicago Bulls.

For the season, the Kings revealed a new primary logo with the team name on a purple ribbon with a silver crown and jousting sticks, and changed their uniforms adding purple and black to their color scheme, plus adding new half black, and half purple alternate road uniforms with checkered flag side panels. The home and road jerseys both remained in use until 2002, while the primary logo lasted until 2016, and the alternate jerseys lasted until 1997.

Draft picks

Roster

Roster Notes
 Power forward Frank Brickowski missed the entire season due to a shoulder injury he sustained during the preseason.

Regular season

Season standings

z - clinched division title
y - clinched division title
x - clinched playoff spot

Record vs. opponents

Game log

Regular season

|- align="center" bgcolor="#ffcccc"
| 5
| November 15, 19945:30p.m. PST
| @ Houston
| L 99–105
| Richmond (31)
| Polynice (11)
| Webb (6)
| The Summit14,656
| 3–2

|- align="center" bgcolor="#ffcccc"
| 45
| February 8, 19957:30p.m. PST
| Houston
| L 86–97
| Richmond (28)
| Smith (8)
| Webb (5)
| ARCO Arena17,317
| 25–20
|- align="center"
|colspan="9" bgcolor="#bbcaff"|All-Star Break
|- style="background:#cfc;"
|- bgcolor="#bbffbb"

|- align="center" bgcolor="#ccffcc"
| 72
| April 4, 19957:30p.m. PDT
| Houston
| W 109–105
| Williams (30)
| Smith (11)
| Webb (6)
| ARCO Arena17,317
| 35–37
|- align="center" bgcolor="#ffcccc"
| 78
| April 15, 19955:30p.m. PDT
| @ Houston
| L 84–98
| Richmond, Williams (19)
| Grant (9)
| Brown, Williams (6)
| The Summit16,611
| 46–32

Player statistics

NOTE: Please write the players statistics in alphabetical order by last name.

Awards and records
 Mitch Richmond, All-NBA Second Team
 Brian Grant, NBA All-Rookie Team 1st Team

Transactions
The Kings were involved in the following transactions during the 1994–95 season.

Trades
The Kings were not involved in any trades during the 1994–95 season.

Free agents

Additions

Subtractions

Player Transactions Citation:

References

See also
 1994-95 NBA season

Sacramento Kings seasons
Sacramento
Sacramento
Sacramento